Matt Stankiewitch (born February 8, 1990) is an American football center who is currently a free agent. He played college football for Penn State from 2008 to 2012.

Recruiting

Stankiewitch graduated from Blue Mountain High School in Pennsylvania in 2008.  Stankiewitch was a 2 time all-state football player after his junior and senior seasons.  He started at left guard in the Under Armour All-America Game and started at center in the Big 33 Football Classic where he was the Pennsylvania team captain in the game.

College Football Career
At Penn State, Stankiewitch redshirted in 2008 before starting two games at left guard in 2009. In 2010, Stankiewitch played in six games before missing the rest of the season due to illness. He was able to remain healthy throughout 2011 and 2012, finishing his career having made 25 starts at center and 2 starts at guard, second highest among the 2012 senior class. The talented and tough Stankiewitch helped anchor a unit that led the Big Ten in fewest sacks allowed in 2011 (14 in 13 games).  The physical and driven Stankiewitch led the Penn State Nittany Lions in snaps played in 2011 & 2012 with 966 in 2011.  During the course of the 2012 season, Stankiewitch was awarded 5 game balls and was a finalist for the Rimington Trophy.  He was awarded  1st team all Big Ten as center after the 2012 season.  He was instrumental in helping Coach Bill O'Brien's Nittany Lions lead the Big Ten in total offense (437.0 ypg) in conference games and ranking second in scoring offense (32.6 ppg) and second in pass offense (283.1 ypg) against Big Ten foes. Stankiewitch helped the Nittany Lions gain more than 500 yards of total offense three times in conference play, topped by 546 yards against Indiana, its highest total against a Big Ten foe since gaining 557 yards against Michigan State in 2008. Lastly, Stankiewitch played the most plays on the Penn State football team during Joe Paterno's last season as head football coach.

Professional Football Career
On April 28, 2013, he was signed as an undrafted free agent by the New England Patriots. On August 5, 2013, Stankiewitch was re-signed by the Patriots.

On December 30, 2013, the Jacksonville Jaguars signed Stankiewitch to reserve/future contract.

He was released from injured reserve on August 20, 2014 after sustaining a left hand fracture.

Indoor Rowing

Stankiewitch competed in the Indoor Rowing Americas Continental Qualifier in 2021. He placed 3rd in both the Men's Open 500m and 2000m qualifying for the 2021 World Rowing Indoor Championships (WRICH). He represented the USA and competed at the 2021 WRICH where he placed 10th in the Men's Open 2000m and 13th in the Men's Open 500m.

Stankiewitch competed in the Canadian Indoor Rowing Championships in February 2022. He placed 1st in the Men's Open 500m and qualified for the 2022 World Rowing Indoor Championships (WRICH). He represented the USA and competed at the 2022 WRICH where he placed 7th in the Men's Open 500m.

References

External links
Penn State Nittany Lions bio
 Indoor Rowing Highlights 2021

1990 births
Living people
Sportspeople from Pottsville, Pennsylvania
Players of American football from Pennsylvania
American football centers
Penn State Nittany Lions football players
New England Patriots players
Jacksonville Jaguars players